The Pedro Miguel Fault is a seismic fault that runs beneath the Panama Canal and near Panama City, home to approximately 1.2 million of Panama's approximately 3.3 million inhabitants.

Seismic activity
An earthquake in 1882 caused a regional tsunami. A team of seismologists led by Tom Rockwell of San Diego State University found evidence suggesting both faults slipped simultaneously around 700 CE.

Potential consequences of an earthquake
The Pedro Miguel and the Limón Fault system are a concern for geologists, as a strong earthquake centered on either could damage the canal, drain the lake that supplies water for the operation of its locks, Lago Gatun, and cause severe damage in the capital.

References

Further reading
 Thomas Rockwell, et al. "Neotectonics and Paleoseismology of the Limón and Pedro Miguel Faults in Panamá: Earthquake Hazard to the Panamá Canal." Bulletin of the Seismological Society of America 100.6, December 2010. Online abstract.

Geology of Panama
Seismic faults of North America